JJ+E is a 2021 Swedish film directed by Alexis Almström, written by Dunja Vujovic, based on the book Vinterviken by Mats Wahl and starring Magnus Krepper, Marika Lagercrantz and Simon Mezher. It was released by Netflix on September 8, 2021.

Cast 
 Magnus Krepper as Frank
 Marika Lagercrantz as Vic
 Simon Mezher as Jacob
 Mustapha Aarab as John-John
 Albin Grenholm as Patrik
 Loreen as Maria
 Elsa Öhrn as Elisabeth
 Jonay Pineda Skallak as Sluggo
 Elsa Bergström Terent as Patricia
 Otto Hargne as Karl
 Ambra Andela Ugorji as Dunya
 Pär Boman as Festgäst
 Andreas Gauffin as Kock
 Mikael Örjansberg as Festgäst

References

External links 
 
 

2021 films
Swedish romantic drama films
2020s Swedish-language films
Swedish-language Netflix original films
2021 romantic drama films